The Ministry of Foreign Affairs is responsible for managing the foreign relations of Brazil. Brazil is a significant political and economic power in Latin America and a key player on the world stage. Brazil's foreign policy reflects its role as a regional power and a potential world power and is designed to help protect the country's national interests, national security, ideological goals, and economic prosperity.

Between World War II and 1990, both democratic and military governments sought to expand Brazil's influence in the world by pursuing a state-led industrial policy and an independent foreign policy. Brazilian foreign policy has recently aimed to strengthen ties with other South American countries, engage in multilateral diplomacy through the United Nations and the Organization of American States, and act at times as a countervailing force to U.S. political and economic influence in Latin America.

Overview
Brazil's international relations are based on article 4 of the Federal Constitution, which establishes non-intervention, self-determination, international cooperation and the peaceful settlement of conflicts as the guiding principles of Brazil's relationship with other countries and multilateral organizations. According to the Constitution, the President has ultimate authority over foreign policy, while Congress is tasked with reviewing and considering all diplomatic nominations and international treaties, as well as legislation relating to Brazilian foreign policy.

The Ministry of Foreign Affairs, also known as Itamaraty, is the government department responsible for advising the President and conducting Brazil's foreign relations with other countries and international bodies. Itamaraty's scope includes political, commercial, economic, financial, cultural and consular relations, areas in which it performs the classical tasks of diplomacy: represent, inform and negotiate. Foreign policy priorities are established by the President.

Foreign policy

Brazil's foreign policy is a by-product of the country's unique position as a regional power in Latin America, a leader among developing countries, and an emerging world power. Brazilian foreign policy has generally been based on the principles of multilateralism, peaceful dispute settlement, and non-intervention in the affairs of other countries. Brazil engages in multilateral diplomacy through the Organization of American States and the United Nations, and has increased ties with developing countries in Africa and Asia. Brazil is currently commanding a multinational U.N. stabilization force in Haiti, the MINUSTAH. Instead of pursuing unilateral prerogatives, Brazilian foreign policy has tended to emphasize regional integration, first through the Southern Cone Common Market (Mercosul) and now the Union of South American Nations. Brazil is also committed to cooperation with other Portuguese-speaking nations through joint-collaborations with the rest of the Portuguese-speaking world, in several domains which include military cooperation, financial aid, and cultural exchange. This is done in the framework of CPLP, for instance. Lula da Silva visit to Africa in 2003 included State visits to three Portuguese-speaking African nations (Angola, São Tomé and Príncipe, and Mozambique). Finally, Brazil is also strongly committed in the development and restoration of peace in East Timor, where it has a very powerful influence.

Brazil's political, business, and military ventures are complemented by the country's trade policy. In Brazil, the Ministry of Foreign Relations continues to dominate trade policy, causing the country's commercial interests to be (at times) subsumed by a larger foreign policy goal, namely, enhancing Brazil's influence in Latin America and the world. For example, while concluding meaningful trade agreements with developed countries (such as the United States and the European Union) would probably be beneficial to Brazil's long-term economic self-interest, the Brazilian government has instead prioritized its leadership role within Mercosul and expanded trade ties with countries in Africa, Asia and the Middle East.

Brazil's soft power diplomacy involves institutional strategies such as the formation of diplomatic coalitions to constrain the power of the established great powers. In recent years, it has given high priority in establishing political dialogue with other strategic actors such as India, Russia, China and South Africa through participation in international groupings such as BASIC, IBSA and BRICS. The BRICS states have been amongst the most powerful drivers of incremental change in world diplomacy and they benefit most from the connected global power shifts.

Workers Party administration: 2003-2018

The Brazilian foreign policy under the Lula da Silva administration (2003-2010) focused on the following directives: to contribute toward the search for greater equilibrium and attenuate unilateralism; to strengthen bilateral and multilateral relations in order to increase the country's weight in political and economic negotiations on an international level; to deepen relations so as to benefit from greater economical, financial, technological and cultural interchange; to avoid agreements that could jeopardize development in the long term.

These directives implied precise emphasis on: the search for political coordination with emerging and developing countries, namely India, South Africa, Russia and China; creation of the Union of South American Nations and its derivative bodies, such as the South American Security Council; strengthening of Mercosul; projection at the Doha Round and WTO; maintenance of relations with developed countries, including the United States; undertaking and narrowing of relations with African countries; campaign for the reform of the United Nations Security Council and for a permanent seat for Brazil; and defense of social objectives allowing for a greater equilibrium between the States and populations.

The foreign policy of the Rousseff administration (2011-2016) sought to deepen Brazil's regional commercial dominance and diplomacy, expand Brazil's presence in Africa, and play a major role in the G20 on global warming and in other multilateral settings. At the United Nations, Brazil continues to oppose Economic sanctions and foreign military intervention, while seeking to garner support for a permanent seat at the Security Council. Cooperation with other emerging powers remain a top priority in Brazil's global diplomatic strategy. On the recent airstrike resolution supporting military action in Libya, Brazil joined fellow BRICS in the Council and abstained. On the draft resolution condemning violence in Syria, Brazil worked with India and South Africa to try to bridge the Western powers' divide with Russia and China.

Bolsonaro administration, 2019-2022

After Rousseff's impeachment, Brazil started reconnecting with its western allies. In 2019 Jair Bolsonaro succeeded Michel Temer. The new foreign policy focused on a reapprochement with major governments especially the United States and Colombia in the Americas; Israel, Japan and South Korea in Asia; United Kingdom, Italy and Greece in Europe. The Brazil–Portugal relations were also strengthened, and despite disagreements over the crisis in Venezuela, Brazil remained close to the BRICS countries.

During the 2018 presidential campaign, Bolsonaro said he would make considerable changes to Brazil's foreign relations, saying that the "Itamaraty needs to be in service of the values that were always associated with the Brazilian people". He also said that the country should stop "praising dictators" and attacking democracies, such as the United States, Israel and Italy. In early 2018, he affirmed that his "trip to the five democratic countries the United States, Israel, Japan, South Korea, and Taiwan showed who we will be and we would like to join good people". Bolsonaro has shown distrust towards China throughout the presidential campaign claiming they "[want to] buy Brazil", although Brazil recorded a US$20 billion trade surplus with China in 2018, and China is only the 13th largest source of foreign direct investment into Brazil. Bolsonaro said he wishes to continue to have business with the Chinese but he also said that Brazil should "make better [economic] deals" with other countries, with no "ideological agenda" behind it. His stance towards China has also been interpreted as an attempt to curry favor from the Trump administration to garner concessions from the US. However, Bolsonaro has mostly changed his position on China after he took office, saying that the two countries were "born to walk together" during his visit to Beijing in October 2019. He has also said that Brazil will stay out of the ongoing China-U.S. trade war.

Bolsonaro said that his first international trip as president would be to Israel. Bolsonaro also said that the State of Palestine "is not a country, so there should be no embassy here", adding that "you don't negotiate with terrorists." The announcement was warmly received by the prime minister of Israel, Benjamin Netanyahu, who welcomed Bolsonaro to Israel in March 2019 during the final weeks of a re-election campaign, but was met with condemnation from the Arab League, which warned Bolsonaro it could damage diplomatic ties. "I love Israel," Bolsonaro said in Hebrew at a welcoming ceremony, with Netanyahu at his side, at Tel Aviv's Ben-Gurion airport.

Bolsonaro also praised U.S. President Donald Trump and his foreign policy, and has been called "the tropical Trump". His son Eduardo has indicated that Brazil should distance itself from Iran, sever ties with Nicolás Maduro's government in Venezuela and relocate Brazil's embassy in Israel to Jerusalem. Bolsonaro is widely considered the most pro-American candidate in Brazil since the 1980s. PSL members said that if elected, he would dramatically improve relations between the United States and Brazil. During an October 2017 campaign rally in Miami, he saluted the American flag and led chants of "USA! USA!" to a large crowd. U.S. National Security Advisor John Bolton praised Bolsonaro as a "like-minded" partner and said his victory was a "positive sign" for Latin America.

At the regional level, Bolsonaro praised Argentine President Mauricio Macri for ending the 12-year rule of Néstor and Cristina Fernández de Kirchner, which he saw as similar to Lula and Rousseff. Although he does not have plans to leave the Mercosur, he criticized it for prioritizing ideological issues over economic ones. A staunch anti-communist, Bolsonaro has condemned Cuba's former leader Fidel Castro and the current regime in that island.

Bolsonaro praised British Prime Minister Winston Churchill, saying that he had learned from Churchill: "Patriotism, love for your fatherland, respect for your flag – something that has been lost over the last few years here in Brazil... and governing through example, especially at that difficult moment of the Second World War." Bolsonaro said he's open to the possibility of hosting a U.S. military base in Brazil to counter Russian influence in the region. With the intention to persuade Trump to make Brazil a NATO member in March 2019, Bolsonaro said: "the discussions with the United States will begin in the coming months".

With formal U.S. support for Brazil's entry to OECD in May 2019, Bolsonaro said, "currently, all 36 members of the organization support the entry of the country, fruit of confidence in the new Brazil being built, more free, open and fair". In October 2019, on a state visit to China, he announced the end of the need for visas for Chinese and Indian entry into Brazil. Brazil had already removed the need for visas for people from the U.S., Canada, Japan, and Australia.

Regional policy

Over the first decade of the 21st century, Brazil has firmly established itself as a regional power. It has traditionally, if controversially, been a leader in the inter-American community and played an important role in collective security efforts, as well as in economic cooperation in the Western Hemisphere. Brazilian foreign policy supports economic and political integration efforts in order to reinforce long-standing relationships with its neighbors. It is a founding member of the Organization of American States (OAS) and the Inter-American Treaty of Reciprocal Assistance (Rio Treaty). It has given high priority to expanding relations with its South American neighbors and strengthening regional bodies such as the Latin American Integration Association (ALADI), the Union of South American Nations (UNASUR) and Mercosur. Although integration is the primary purpose of these organizations, they also serve as forums in which Brazil can exercise its leadership and develop consensus around its positions on regional and global issues. Most scholars agree that by promoting integration through organizations like Mercosur and UNASUR, Brazil has been able to solidify its role as a regional power. In addition to consolidating its power within South America, Brazil has sought to expand its influence in the broader region by increasing its engagement in the Caribbean and Central America., although some think this is still a fragile, ongoing process, that can be thwarted by secondary regional powers in South America.

In April 2019 Brazil left Union of South American Nations (Unasur) to become a member of Forum for the Progress and Development of South America (Prosur). In January 2020, Brazil suspended its participation in the Community of Latin American and Caribbean States, (Celac).

Brazil regularly extends export credits and university scholarships to its Latin American neighbors. In recent years, the Brazilian Development Bank (BNDES) has provided US$5 billion worth of loans to countries in the region. Brazil has also increasingly provided Latin American nations with financial aid and technical assistance. Between 2005 and 2009, Cuba, Haiti, and Honduras were the top three recipients of Brazilian assistance, receiving over $50 million annually.

In November 2019, Brazil made a historic move to break with the rest of Latin America on the U.S. embargo of Cuba, becoming the first Latin American country in twenty-six years to vote against condemning the U.S.-led embargo of Cuba at the United Nations General Assembly.

Diplomatic relations

Brazil has a large global network of diplomatic missions, and maintains diplomatic relations with every United Nations member state, in addition to United Nations General Assembly observers Holy See, Palestine and Order of Malta, as well as the Cook Islands and Niue. As of 2019, Brazil's diplomatic network consisted of 194 overseas posts.

Relations with non-UN members or observers: 
 - Brazil does not recognize Kosovo as an independent state and has announced it has no plans to do so without an agreement with Serbia. However, Brazil accepts the Kosovan passport.
 - Brazil does not recognize the Republic of China as it has recognized the People's Republic of China, although it has non-diplomatic relations and maintains a special office in Taiwan. Brazil also accepts the Taiwan passport.

United Nations politics

Brazil is a founding member of the United Nations and participates in all of its specialized agencies. It has participated in 33 United Nations peacekeeping missions and contributed with over 27,000 soldiers. Brazil has been a member of the United Nations Security Council ten times, most recently 2010–2011. Along with Japan, Brazil has been elected more times to the Security Council than any other U.N. member state.

Brazil is currently seeking a permanent seat on the United Nations Security Council. It is a member of the G4, an alliance among Brazil, Germany, India, and Japan for the purpose of supporting each other's bids for permanent seats on the Security Council. They propose the Security Council be expanded beyond the current 15 members to include 25 members. The G4 countries argue that a reform would render the body "more representative, legitimate, effective and responsive" to the realities of the international community in the 21st century.

Outstanding international issues
 Two short sections of the border with Uruguay are in dispute - the Arroio Invernada area of the Quaraí River, and the Brazilian Island at the confluence of the Quaraí River and the Uruguay River.
 Brazil declared in 1986 the sector between 28°W to 53°W Brazilian Antarctica (Antártica Brasileira) as its Zone of Interest. It overlaps Argentine and British claims
 In 2004, the country submitted its claims to the United Nations Commission on the Limits of the Continental Shelf (CLCS) to extend its maritime continental margin.

Foreign aid
Overseas aid has become an increasingly important tool for Brazil's foreign policy. Brazil provides aid through the Brazilian Agency of Cooperation (Abbreviation: ABC), in addition to offering scientific, economical, and technical support. More than half of Brazilian aid is provided to Africa, whereas Latin America receives around 20% of Brazilian aid. The share of aid allocated to the Asian continent is small. Within Africa, more than 80% of Brazilian aid is received by Portuguese-speaking countries. Brazil concentrates its aid for Portuguese-speaking countries in the education sector, specially in secondary and post-secondary education, but it is more committed to agricultural development in other countries. Estimated to be around $1 billion annually, Brazil is on par with China and India and ahead of many more traditional donor countries. The aid tends to consist of technical aid and expertise, alongside a quiet non-confrontational diplomacy to development results. Brazil's aid demonstrates a developing pattern of South-South aid, which has been heralded as a 'global model in waiting'. Some studies have suggested that, by giving aid, Brazil could be trying to get access to mineral and energy resources.

Participation in international organizations
ACS • ACTO • AfDB • ALECSO • BIS • CAF-BDLA • Cairns Group • CAN • CDB • CPLP • FAO • G4 • BASIC countries • G8+5 • G15 • G20 • G20+ • G24 • G77 • IADB • IDB • IAEA • IBRD • IBSA •ICAO • ICC • ICRM • IDA • IFAD • IFC • IFRCS • IHO • ILO • IMF • IMO • Inmarsat •INSARAG • Intelsat • Interpol • IOC • IOM • ISO • ITU • LAES • LAIA • Mercosul • MINUSTAH • NAM • NSG • OAS • OEI • OPANAL • OPCW • PCA • Rio Group • Rio Treaty • UN • UNASUR • UNCTAD • UNESCO • UNHCR • UNIDO • UNITAR • UNMIL • UNMIS • UNMOVIC • UNOCI • UNTAET • UNWTO • UPU • WCO • WHO • WIPO • WMO • WTO • ZPCAS

Bilateral relations

Africa

Americas

Asia

Europe

Oceania

See also
 Brazil and the European Union
 Brazil and the United Nations
 Brazil and weapons of mass destruction
 Brazilian Antarctica
 List of diplomatic missions in Brazil
 List of diplomatic missions of Brazil
 Mercosul
 Ministry of Foreign Relations of Brazil
 Union of South American Nations
 Visa requirements for Brazilian citizens

References

Bibliography 

 Abellán, Javier, and José Antonio Alonso, eds. The role of Brazil as a new donor of development aid in Africa (University of Bologna, 2017). 
 Almeida, Paulo Roberto de. "Never before seen in Brazil: Luis Inácio Lula da Silva's grand diplomacy." Revista Brasileira de Política Internacional 53 (2010): 160–177. online
 Buarque, Daniel. "Brazil is not (perceived as) a serious country: exposing gaps between the external images and the international ambitions of the nation." Brasiliana: Journal for Brazilian Studies 8.1-2 (2019): 285-314 online.
 Burges, Sean W. Brazil in the world: The international relations of a South American giant (2016) excerpt; wide-ranging survey.
 Burges, Sean W. Brazilian Foreign Policy after the Cold War (UP of Florida, 2009)
 Burges, Sean W., and Fabrício H. Chagas Bastos. "The importance of presidential leadership for Brazilian foreign policy." Policy Studies 38.3 (2017): 277–290. online
 Burges, Sean W. "Without Sticks or Carrots: Brazilian Leadership in South America during the Cardoso Era, 1992–2003.” Bulletin of Latin American Research 25#1 (2006): 23–42.
 Burges, Sean W. Consensual Hegemony: Theorizing Brazilian Foreign Policy after the  Cold War.” International Relations (2008) 22 (1): 65–84.
 Brazilian foreign policy under Jair Bolsonaro: far-right populism and the rejection of the liberal international order.
Academic Journal
 Casarões, Guilherme et al. "Brazilian foreign policy under Jair Bolsonaro: far-right populism and the rejection of the liberal international order." Cambridge Review of International Affairs vol 34 (September 2021), p1-21. https://doi.org/10.1080/09557571.2021.1981248
 Chagas-Bastos, Fabrício H., and Marcela Franzoni. "The dumb giant: Brazilian foreign policy under Jair Bolsonaro." E-international Relations 16 (2019). online
 Dehshiri, Mohammad Reza, and Mohammad Hossein Neshastesazan. "Human Rights Diplomacy: Case Study of Brazil." World Sociopolitical Studies 2.1 (2018): 87–125. online
 De Sá Guimarães, Feliciano, and Irma Dutra De Oliveira E Silva. "Far-right populism and foreign policy identity: Jair Bolsonaro's ultra-conservatism and the new politics of alignment." International Affairs 97.2 (2021): 345–363. online
 Gardini, G., and M. Tavares de Almeida. Foreign Policy Responses to the Rise of Brazil: Balancing Power in Emerging States (Palgrave, 2017). How other states responded. excerpt
 Long, Tom. "The US, Brazil and Latin America: the dynamics of asymmetrical regionalism." Contemporary Politics 24.1 (2018): 113–129. online
 Lopes, Dawisson Belém. "De-westernization, democratization, disconnection: the emergence of Brazil’s post-diplomatic foreign policy." Global Affairs 6.2 (2020): 167–184. online
 Magalhães, Diego Trindade D'Ávila, and Laís Forti Thomaz. "The Conspiracy-Myth Diplomacy: anti-globalism vs pragmatism in Bolsonaro’s foreign policy for South American integration." OIKOS 20.3 (2022). online
 Mares, David R., and Harold A. Trinkunas, eds. Aspirational power: Brazil on the long road to global influence (Brookings Institution Press, 2016).
 Pitts, Bryan. "The Empire Strikes Back: US-Brazil Relations from Obama to Trump" in The Future of US Empire in the Americas (Routledge, 2020) pp. 165–187.
 Rossone de Paula, Francine. The Emergence of Brazil to the Global Stage: Ascending and Falling in the International Order of Competition (2018) preview; also online review
 Rossone de Paula, Francine. "Brazil’s non-indifference: a case for a feminist diplomatic agenda or geopolitics as usual?." International Feminist Journal of Politics 21.1 (2019): 47–66.
 Saraiva, Miriam Gomes. "The democratic regime and the changes in Brazilian foreign policy towards South America." Brazilian Political Science Review 14 (2020). online
  Smith, Joseph. Brazil and the United States: Convergence and Divergence (U of Georgia Press; 2010), 256 pages
 Visentini, Paulo. "The Brazil of Lula: a global and affirmative diplomacy (2003-2010)" Austral: Brazilian Journal of Strategy & International Relations 1.1 (2012): 23–35. online
 Vigevani, Tullo, and Gabriel Cepaluni, eds. Brazilian Foreign Policy in Changing Times: The Quest for Autonomy from Sarney to Lula (Lexington Books, 2009).
 Weiffen, Brigitte. "Foreign Policy and International Relations: Taking Stock after Two Years of the Bolsonaro Administration." in Brazil under Bolsonaro. How endangered is democracy? (2022): 55–66. online

Historical
 Bethell, Leslie. The Abolition of the Brazilian Slave Trade: Britain, Brazil and the Slave Trade Question (2009) excerpt
 Fritsch, Winston. External Restraints on Economic Policy in Brazil, 1889-1930 (1988), emphasis on role of Great Britain.
 Garcia, Eugenio V. "Antirevolutionary diplomacy in oligarchic Brazil, 1919–30." Journal of Latin American Studies 36.4 (2004): 771–796. online
 Graham, Richard. Britain and the Onset of Modernization in Brazil 1850–1914 (1972) excerpt
 Harmer, Tanya. "Brazil's Cold War in the Southern Cone, 1970–1975' Cold War History (2012) 12#4 pp 659-681.
 Hilton, Stanley E. "The Argentine factor in twentieth-century Brazilian foreign policy strategy." Political Science Quarterly 100.1 (1985): 27–51. online
 Mota, Isadora Moura. "On the Verge of War: Black Insurgency, the ‘Christie Affair’, and British Antislavery in Brazil." Slavery & Abolition 43.1 (2022): 120-139. London threatened war in 1862-1863 in the "Christie Affair."
 Rivere, Peter. Absent Minded Imperialism: Britain and the Expansion of Empire in 19th-Century Brazil (1995)
 Rodrigues, Jose Honorio. "The Foundations of Brazil's Foreign Policy." International Affairs 38.3 (1962): 324–338; covers 1822 to 1889. online
 Roett, Riordan. "Brazil ascendant: international relations and geopolitics in the late 20th century." Journal of international affairs (1975): 139–154. online
 Skidmore, Thomas E. "The Historiography of Brazil, 1889-1964," Hispanic American Historical Review (1976) 56#1 pp 81–109; emphasis is on economics and foreign policy. DOI: 10.2307/2513726
 Smith, Joseph. Unequal Giants: Diplomatic Relations between the United States & Brazil, 1889-1930 1991).
 Topik, Steven C. Trade & Gunboats: The United States & Brazil in the Age of Empire (1997), covers 1870 to 1899.

External links
 The Sino-Brazilian Principles in a Latin American and BRICS Context: The Case for Comparative Public Budgeting Legal Research Wisconsin International Law Journal, 13 May 2015
 Ministério das Relações Exteriores - Official website of the Brazilian Ministry of Foreign Relations 
 Ministério das Relações Exteriores - Official website of the Brazilian Ministry of Foreign Relations
 Brazilian Mission to the United Nations - Official website 
 Agência Brasileira de Cooperação - Official website of the Brazilian Agency of Cooperation 
 IBSA News and Media - IBSA Dialogue Forum | India, Brazil and South Africa | News, Opinion and Analysis